Oyster Peak was named by George M. Dawson in 1884. It is located in the Sawback Range in Alberta.

See also
 Mountains of Alberta

References

Two-thousanders of Alberta
Alberta's Rockies